Eye of the Beholder is a role-playing video game for personal computers and video game consoles developed by Westwood Associates. It was published by Strategic Simulations, Inc. in 1991, for the MS-DOS operating system and later ported to the Amiga, the Sega CD and the SNES. The Sega CD version features a soundtrack composed by Yuzo Koshiro and Motohiro Kawashima. A port to the Atari Lynx handheld was developed by NuFX in 1993, but was not released. In 2002, an adaptation of the same name was developed by Pronto Games for the Game Boy Advance.

The game has two sequels, Eye of the Beholder II: The Legend of Darkmoon, also released in 1991, and Eye of the Beholder III: Assault on Myth Drannor, released in 1993. The third game, however, was not developed by Westwood, which had been acquired by Virgin Interactive in 1992 and created the Lands of Lore series instead.

Plot
The lords of the city of Waterdeep hire a team of adventurers to investigate an evil coming from beneath the city. The adventurers enter the city's sewer, but the entrance gets blocked by a collapse caused by Xanathar, the eponymous beholder. The team descends further beneath the city, going through Dwarf and Drow clans, to Xanathar's lair, where the final confrontation takes place.

Once the eponymous beholder is killed, the player would be treated to a small blue window describing that the beholder was killed and that the adventurers returned to the surface where they were treated as heroes. Nothing else was mentioned in the ending and there were no accompanying graphics. This was changed in the later released Amiga version, which featured an animated ending.

Gameplay

Eye of the Beholder features a first-person perspective in a three-dimensional dungeon, very similar to the earlier Dungeon Master. The player controls four characters, initially, using a point-and-click interface to fight monsters. This can be increased to a maximum of six characters, by resurrecting one or more skeletons from dead non-player characters (NPCs), or finding NPCs that are found throughout the dungeons.

The possibility to increase the size of the player's party through the recruiting of NPCs was a tradition in all of the Eye of the Beholder series. It was also possible to import a party from Eye of the Beholder into The Legend of Darkmoon or from The Legend of Darkmoon into Assault on Myth Drannor; thus, a player could play through all three games with the same party.

Development
The graphics for the MS-DOS version were created using Deluxe Paint. Over 150 Adlib sound effects exist in the game's audio.

Reception

Critical reception

Eye of the Beholder was reviewed in 1991 in Dragon #171 by Hartley, Patricia, and Kirk Lesser in "The Role of Computers" column, who gave it 5 out of 5 stars. It was #1 on the Software Publishers Association's list of top MS-DOS games for April 1991, the last SSI D&D game to reach the rank. Dennis Owens of Computer Gaming World called it "a stunning, brilliantly graphic and agonizingly tricky" 3-D CRPG. The magazine stated that the game's VGA graphics and sound card audio finally gave IBM PC owners a Dungeon Master-like game. Scorpia, another reviewer for the magazine, was less positive. Although also praising the graphics and audio, stating that they "really give you the feeling of being in an actual dungeon", she criticized the awkward spell user interface and the "outrageous" abrupt ending. Other areas that needed work included the combat, plot, and NPC interaction; nonetheless, she was hopeful that with such improvements "the Legend series will become one of the leaders in the CRPG field". In 1993 Scorpia called the game "an impressive first effort that bodes well for the future".

The One gave the Amiga version of Eye of the Beholder an overall score of 92%, heavily comparing it to Dungeon Master, stating that "Comparisons to the [aging]  classic – Dungeon Master – are inevitable. When two games look this similar, even their programmers would have trouble telling them apart." The One praises Eye of the Beholder's gameplay, stating that "in contrast to previous AD&D titles, there's more emphasis on puzzle-solving than combat – a refreshing change ... Combat is also handled extremely well, the spells and 'ranged weapons' rules are all faithful to the original game ... The gameplay works wonderfully, conjuring up both the spirit and the atmosphere that you get from [tabletop AD&D]." Despite this, The One expresses that Eye of the Beholder is on par with Dungeon Master and Chaos Strikes Back, but states that Eye of the Beholder is still "an essential purchase for followers of the AD&D series".

Hailing the game as "a dream come true" for Dungeons & Dragons fans, Electronic Gaming Monthly gave the Super NES version a 6.2 out of 10, praising its 3-D graphics and variety of characters. They gave the Sega CD version a 7.2 out of 10, this time praising the ability to create custom characters but criticizing the audio. They also remarked that the game has a difficult learning curve. While reviewing the Sega CD version, Computer and Video Games said it is "Not quite up there with Snatcher, but without doubt a highly ace role-player".

According to GameSpy in 2004, despite the issues in the first Eye of the Beholder, "most players found the game well worth the effort". IGN ranked Eye of the Beholder No. 8 on their list of "The Top 11 Dungeons & Dragons Games of All Time" in 2014. Ian Williams of Paste rated the game #8 on his list of "The 10 Greatest Dungeons and Dragons Videogames" in 2015. In 1991, PC Format placed Eye of the Beholder on its list of the 50 best computer games of all time. The editors called it a "classic romp through dungeons dealing with monsters, puzzles, traps and things mythical".

Commercial performance
SSI sold 129,234 copies of Eye of the Beholder. By mid-1991, over 150,000 copies had been sold worldwide. The Eye of the Beholder series overall, including the game's two sequels, reached global sales above 350,000 units by 1996.

Promotion
In January 1991, SSI participated in Computer Gaming World'''s Top Ad contest and their cover art for Eye of the Beholder came in first place among voting readers, despite the magazine publisher's objection to the piece. From February till October 1991, SSI started up a contest "Beholder Bonus", which required players to find a bonus feature (easter egg) in each level of the game, indicated by an onscreen message. The first 50 PC players and 50 Amiga players to discover all 12 features would win $100 worth of prizes.

Legacy
Sequels
There were two sequels:Eye of the Beholder II: The Legend of Darkmoon used a modified version of the first game's engine, added outdoor areas and greatly increased the amount of interaction the player had with their environment, along with substantially more 'roleplaying' aspects to the game.Eye of the Beholder III: Assault on Myth Drannor was not developed by Westwood, the developer of Eye of the Beholder and The Legend of Darkmoon, but rather in-house by the publisher SSI.Eye of the Beholder Trilogy (1995, SSI) was a rerelease of all the three games for MS-DOS on CD-ROM. Interplay released the three games along with a number of other AD&D DOS Games in two collection CDs: The Forgotten Realms Archives (1997) and Gamefest: Forgotten Realms Classics (2001).

Related games
Several modules for Neverwinter Nights (2002) have been created by fans as remakes of the original Eye of the Beholder'' game. A team of Indie game developers led by Andreas Larsson did a fan conversion of the game for the Commodore 64 available for free as a cartridge image.

References

External links

Review in Compute!
Review in Info

1991 video games
Amiga 1200 games
Amiga games
Cancelled Atari Lynx games
DOS games
First-person party-based dungeon crawler video games
Forgotten Realms video games
NEC PC-9801 games
Pony Canyon games
Role-playing video games
ScummVM-supported games
Sega CD games
Single-player video games
Strategic Simulations games
Super Nintendo Entertainment System games
U.S. Gold games
Video games developed in the United States
Video games featuring protagonists of selectable gender
Video games scored by Motohiro Kawashima
Video games scored by Yasuaki Fujita
Video games scored by Yuzo Koshiro
Westwood Studios games
Windows Mobile Professional games